Jingdian Shiwen, often abbreviated as Shiwen in Chinese philological literature, was a c. 583 exegetical dictionary or glossary, edited by the Tang dynasty classical scholar Lu Deming. Based on the works of 230 scholars during the Han, Wei, and Six Dynasties periods, this Chinese dictionary analyzes the pronunciations (given in historically invaluable fanqie annotations) and meanings of terms in the Confucian Thirteen Classics and the Daoist Daodejing and Zhuang Zi. It also cites some ancient books that are no longer extant, and are only known through Jingdian Shiwen.

Bernhard Karlgren considered Jingdian Shiwen and the 601 Qieyun rime dictionary as the two primary sources for reconstructing Middle Chinese. Many studies in Chinese historical linguistics (for instance, see References) use the important Jingdian Shiwen data.

References

Further reading
 Kishima Fumio, "Changes of the Jingdian Shiwen 經典釋文 – As seen in the Patterns of Usage of the Shiwen copies of the Shundian 舜典", The Toho Gakuho: Journal of Oriental Studies 73, 2001. (in Japanese)
 Lee Tat-leung 杜其容, "A Study of Pronunciations Different from the Usual in Mao Shih Yin I, A Part of Lu Teh Ming's Ching Tien Shih Wen 毛詩釋文異乎常讀之音切研究", United College Journal (聯合書院學報) 4:1–56, 1965. (in Chinese)
 Wang Kuan-to, "A Critical Analysis of the Pronunciation and the Meaning of the Word 樂 in the Jingdian Shiwen (A Summary)", The Journal of the Institute of Chinese Studies of The Chinese University of Hong Kong 8.

External links
Jingdian Shiwen, Internet archive
Various editions of the Jingdian Shiwen – Chinese Text Project
 経典釈文 (断簡), c. 749-756 Japanese Jingdian shiwen fragment, Kōfukuji Temple (興福寺)

Chinese dictionaries
Tang dynasty literature
Middle Chinese
6th-century Chinese books